The Ministry of Public Security is a cabinet ministry of the Government of Sri Lanka  responsible for law and order. The ministry is responsible for formulating and implementing national policy on law and order and other subjects which come under its purview. The ministry manages the country's police. The current Minister of Public Security is Tiran Alles. The ministry's secretary is Jagath Wijeweera.

History
Since independence in 1948 the Sri Lankan police had come under the Ministry of Defence. The Lessons Learnt and Reconciliation Commission had recommended that policing be transferred to a separate ministry. The Ministry of Law and Order was established on 16 August 2013 to manage policing in the country.

Ministers
The Minister of Public Security is a member of the Cabinet of Sri Lanka.

Secretaries

References

External links
 

2013 establishments in Sri Lanka
Public Security
Sri Lanka
Public Security
Ministries established in 2013